Shaheen Air International was a private Pakistani airline with its head office at Jinnah International Airport in Karachi and was founded by the Shehbai family. It remained Pakistan's second-largest airline until its liquidation in 2018 due to financial troubles. In December 2018, the owners of the airline, Kashif Mehmud Sehbai and Ehsan Khalid Sehbai, fled to Canada to avoid debt-related prosecution. The airline owed  billion to Civil Aviation Authority of Pakistan (CAA) and its employees salaries.

It provided passenger, cargo and charter services, to major cities in Pakistan and the Middle East. It suspended all operations in October 2018.

History 

 
Shaheen Air Cargo was a division of Shaheen Air International that was established in 1993, soon after the inception of the airline. Shaheen Air provided special services for sending small time-sensitive consignments.
 
On 22 May 2004, the Civil Aviation Authority of Pakistan (CAA) grounded Shaheen Air as the airline owed it millions of rupees. Three days later the airline was cleared by the CAA to resume its domestic and international operations. The clearance letter was issued by CAA following receipt of a payment from Shaheen Air International towards the outstanding dues and funds. The same year, Shaheen Air International (SAI) became Shaheen Air and the airline introduced a new livery and corporate website.

Shaheen Air started its own maintenance repair organization (MRO) by the name of Shaheen Engineering and Aircraft Maintenance Services (SEAMS) to provide maintenance services to Shaheen Air as well as other regional and international airlines.
 
In its international operations, Shaheen Air operated between Pakistan and numerous destinations in the Middle East. Shaheen Air once started flight operations to Riyadh with three different routes from Pakistan.

Shaheen Air was Pakistan's second-largest airline next to the flag carrier, Pakistan International Airlines but due to the downturn in 2018, the airline declined. The airline was declared a defaulter by PCAA and FBR. In October 2018, SAI flight operations were completely suspended by the local regularity body PCAA and the airline declared a financial defaulter. Since November 2018, all SAI offices have closed.

Investor Rumor and Liquidation
Shaheen reported an un-named investor from Saudi Arabia was to help the airline return to service from January 2019.

Even after repeated protests by the 5,000 employees, who were still owed months of wages, as of February 2019 no investigation into the matter had been initiated by any of the agencies, including the Federal Board of Revenue, Pakistan Civil Aviation Authority and the Federal Ministry of Aviation.

Destinations 

Shaheen Air operated the following services as of July 2018. All of their routes were suspended in October 2018. In January 2019, they announced they would not resume business.

Fleet 

Two Airbus A320-200 remain in storage. The rest of the aircraft were leased and were returned to the lessors after the airline ceased operations. Pakistani law requires a passenger airline to have a minimum of three aircraft in its fleet, and Shaheen's fleet of two stored aircraft does not fulfil the mandatory requirement of the license to operate. Many of the old derelict planes of Shaheen Air are abandoned at Jinnah International Airport. On 26 January 2020, one of these planes, a Boeing 737-200, registered as AP-BIS, was destroyed by fire.

Former fleet
Boeing 737-200
Boeing 737-400
Airbus A319-100
Airbus A320-200
Airbus A330-200
Airbus A330-300
Airbus A380-800
Boeing 787-9

Accidents and incidents
22 April 2012 - the main landing gear of a Boeing 737-400 operating as Flight 122 from Islamabad to Karachi collapsed during its landing at Karachi. No injuries were reported among the 122 passengers and 6 crew on board.
24 September 2015 -  a Boeing 737-400 registered AP-BJR and operating as Flight 791 took off from a taxiway instead of the runway while departing from Sharjah. The aircraft was undamaged in the incident.
23 November 2015  - A Boeing 737-400 registration AP-BJO, operating as Flight 142, collapsed during a botched and mishandled landing. There were 112 passengers and 7 crew members on board; 10 passengers were injured.  The cause of the accident was due to the captain being intoxicated and under the influence of alcohol.
26 January 2020 - a Boeing 737-200 registration AP-BIS, was destroyed by fire, the incident occurred at Karachi Jinnah International Airport, Pakistan.

References

External links

Official website
 

Defunct airlines of Pakistan
Airlines established in 1993
Airlines disestablished in 2018
Companies based in Karachi
Pakistani companies established in 1993
Pakistani companies disestablished in 2018